Pedal Pusher is a play written by the English director and playwright, Roland Smith.

Pedal Pusher(s), Pedal pusher(s) or Pedalpusher(s) may also refer to:
 Pedal pushers, a calf-length trouser
 "Pedalpusher", song by Stereophonics on 2005 album Language. Sex. Violence. Other?